Meat inspection is a crucial part of food safety measures and encompasses all measures directed towards the prevention of raw and processed meat spoilage. Relevant regulations include:
Federal Meat Inspection Act 
Wholesome Meat Act

These are enacted by
Food Safety and Inspection Service
Canadian Food Inspection Agency
Safe Meat and Poultry Inspection Panel
amongst others.

Scientific counsel is provided by institutions like the American Meat Science Association and similar.

See also
American Meat Institute
Food grading
Meat industry

Meat industry